Godse is a 2022 Indian Telugu-language vigilante action thriller film written and directed by Gopiganesh Pattabhi and produced by C. Kalyan under the banner of CK Screens. The film stars Satyadev and Aishwarya Lekshmi (in her Telugu debut). The film is a remake of the 2018 Korean film The Negotiation. Godse released on 17 June 2022 to mixed reviews from the critics.

Plot 
Vaishali, a negotiating officer is assigned to negotiate with a mysterious person named Nathuram Godse, who kidnaps several high-profile businessmen and SP Sameer. Vaishali negotiates Godse, while the police secretly surround his base in a secret island. Godse tells Vaishali to bring Industrial Minister Phani Kumar. After answering many questions, Phani Kumar reveals that the companies are actually called as
shell companies which are non-existent and only printed on newspaper, which they can use for fraud against jobless men into getting jobs in exchange for profits. 

This enrages Godse, who kills Sameer despite threats from DGP. Vaishali leaves after scolding the Home Secretary, where she manages to find that Godse is actually a London-based businessman named Viswanath Ramachandra. Anand Kumar is replaced to negotiate with Godse, but the latter warns him to leave by threatening and kidnapping his minister uncle at knifepoint, and tells that he wants to negotiate with Vaishali only. Vaishali is called back and Godse tells her to call  MP Ajay Sarathy. Godse ask Ajay about killing his pregnant wife Shalini by making it as a robbery case which was negotiated by Vaishali earlier, and also brings the goon who had killed Shalini. 

When asked about his purpose, Godse asks Vaishali to bring media baron Punyamurthy, retired Chief Justice Anantha Krishnan and Chief Election Commissioner Lakshmi Narayana. Afterwards, Godse kills the dacoits. Later, it is revealed that Godse was a businessman who arrived at World Business Summit and was proposed a project by Phani Kumar and Ajay Sarathy. Godse refused the project and later arrived at his village for a college reunion, but learns that his best friend Rajaram had committed suicide. Rajaram was an science aspirant who is unemployed and was working as a painter. When Rajaram was insulted and unable to become a scientist, he committed suicide. 

Godse decide to shut down his businesses and start a new business firm in India, but was stopped by Ajay, Phani Kumar and the CM by making him to stop the construction and leave back for London. However, Godse decide to stay back and with the help of his hacker friend manages to gather evidence about the CM, Phani Kumar and Ajay's illegal activities and heads to provide these evidence to the Governor, but the CM orchestrates an accident which killed his friends, but Godse manages to escape and also learns about Shalini's death which makes him to take up the part of vigilante justice. Having learnt all this, Godse reveals that he already leaked about the ministers' illegal dealings and qualifications to the media. 

Anand Kumar and his team head to the island, but finds that Godse escaped and accidentally detonated the bomb, which explodes killing Anand and the businessmen. 
Godse arrives at the CM's house with purchased drones and attacks the security, where he meets CM, Ajay and others. He makes an impassioned speech about the sacrifices of parents and students seeking jobs which is not their qualification, along with other aspirant businessmen seeking to do something for the nation. Godse then detonates his bomb jacket, which explodes and kills the CM and others along with him. Vaishali recovers a hard drive which was delivered by Godse's friend, and she submits the hard drive to the Governor, explaining that Godse's actions came due to the corrupt  political system. With this, the Governor takes actions against the politicians.

Cast 

 Satyadev as Viswanath Rama Chandra alias Nathuram Godse
 Aishwarya Lekshmi as Vaishali
 Brahmaji as Special Officer
 Tanikella Bharani as Retired Judge
 Nagendra Babu as Governor 
 Jia Sharma as Shalini, wife of Viswanath Rama Chandra
 Mathew Varghese
 Prudhvi Raj as Industrial Minister Phani Kumar
 Noel Sean as Raghava, Godse's friend
 Priyadarshi Pulikonda as Hacker
 Chaitanya Krishna as Rajaram, Godse's friend
 Pawan Santosh
 Guru Charan
 Sasikumar Rajendran
 Ravi Prakash as SP Sameer

Production 
The principal photography of the film began on 11 February 2021. The film marks Aishwarya Lekshmi (in her Telugu debut).

Release

Theatrical
The film was released theatrically on 17 June 2022.

Home media
The digital streaming rights of the film is owned by Netflix. The film is scheduled to stream on Netflix from 17 July 2022.

Reception

Paul Nicodemus of The Times of India rated the film 3 out of 5 and wrote "Satyadev once again hit it out of the park when it comes to getting under the skin of his characters. The actor aces his role like a breeze and evokes the right emotions among the viewers". 123Telugu rated the film 2.5 out of 5 and wrote, "On the whole, Godse is a half-baked hostage drama that has a decent first half. The second half is dull and the emotional aspect does not click. In all this, what keeps you going is Satyadev’s sincere and intense performance".

Y. Sunita Chowdhary of The Hindu opined that the film "has an interesting story of police-politicians nexus, but fails to engage". Asianet Telugu gave a rating of 2 out of 5 and felt that the film is lacks freshness and similar to Prathinidhi.

References 

Indian action thriller films
2022 action thriller films
2020s Telugu-language films
2022 films
Films set in Andhra Pradesh
Films set in Hyderabad, India
Films shot in Hyderabad, India
Indian remakes of South Korean films